Vladimir Aga (born 9 November 1987 in Chișinău) is a former Moldovan footballer who played as midfielder, and who currently is football manager at the Estonian club Jõhvi FC Phoenix.

Career

Player 
Aga began to play football at 12 years, and his first coach was Sergiu Balan. 

In 2007 and 2008 he played for Moldova's under 21 futsal team.

He debuted in Moldovan Super League playing for FC Costuleni, on 20 February 2011 in a match against FC Milsami.

On 29 October 2021 Aga became a playing manager of Estonian futsal team Jõhvi FC Phoenix, which on that day has debuted in Estonian first futsal league.

Manager 
From 2015 until 2016 Aga was part of main and under-19 coach staffs of Moldova women football teams.

In February 2018, Aga together with Marius Codescu headed up the Moldovan Super League club Zimbru Chișinău, but in June has resigned from the post. Under Aga, on 23 May 2018, in the final of Moldovan Cup Zimbru has lost 0-2 to Milsami Orhei. From June until November 2019 Aga returned as head coach of FC Zimbru. 

Aga holds an UEFA PRO manager license.

On 1 July 2020 Aga headed up the Estonian club Jõhvi FC Phoenix, where he concomitantly runs the undeer-16 team, and from autumn of 2021 - also the futsal team of feniks.

Personal life 
Aga is married and has two children.

Honours 
 Runner-up of Moldovan Cup (1): 2017/18

References

Further reading

External links 
 Interview on YouTube

1987 births
Living people
Footballers from Chișinău
Moldovan footballers
Association football midfielders
Moldovan Super Liga players
Moldovan football managers
FC Zimbru Chișinău managers
Moldovan Super Liga managers
Moldovan expatriate football managers
Moldovan expatriate sportspeople in Estonia